is a Japanese voice actress, singer and YouTuber from Chiba Prefecture. She is a member of the singing unit TrySail, along with Sora Amamiya and Momo Asakura. She is affiliated with Music Ray'n. Her notable roles include Akeno Misaki in High School Fleet, Yuki Kusakabe in Interviews with Monster Girls, and Hikayu Hoshikawa in Re:Creators. Under her activities as a YouTuber she goes by the name 417P.

Filmography

Anime

Films

Video games

Discography

Singles

References

External links
 
 
Official agency profile 

 at Oricon 

1996 births
Living people
Japanese women pop singers
Japanese YouTubers
Japanese video game actresses
Japanese voice actresses
Musicians from Chiba Prefecture
Voice actresses from Chiba Prefecture
21st-century Japanese actresses
21st-century Japanese women singers
21st-century Japanese singers